Block FACT is part of a Russian far-right group, operating in St. Petersburg and established in the autumn of 2010.

Publicity
The public statements from Block FACT often represent hard anti-communism. The organization's criteria for labeling a group as communist are quite broad. For example, the regimes of Muammar Gaddafi, Bashar Assad, and even the Kingdom of Bahrain were labeled as "communist" by Block FACT.

Activities 
Block FACT claimed responsibility for the beating of St. Petersburg Stalinist historian , setting fire to a Communist Party car (September 2011), and assaulting magistrate Alexei Kuznetsov (April 2013). Block FACT claimed responsibility for beating Communist Party secretary Alexey Rusakov (August 2012), burning a Communist Party car (February 2012), desecrating and destroying a series of Soviet memorials (plaques Lenin, Uritsky, Romanov, Trefolev, Voytik), and attacking several activists of Communist organizations.

Some commentators characterized the actions of Block FACT as a relaxed variant of European neo-fascist terrorism of the 1970s. It is assumed that the activists of Block FACT attacked a former Duma deputy, Viktor Tyulkin. The leader of the St. Petersburg communist organizations, Tyulkin, was beaten on 4 October 2013, after a communist demonstration commemorating the 20th anniversary of the events of October 1993. One of the attackers congratulated Tyulkin with "happy holidays".

See also 
 Decommunization in Russia
 Decommunization (Russian political movement)

References

2010 establishments in Russia
Anti-communist organizations
Far-right politics in Russia
Neo-fascist terrorism
Organizations established in 2010
Organizations based in Saint Petersburg
Gangs in Russia
Politics of Saint Petersburg
Terrorism in Russia
Ruscism